Cottonwood Creek is a major stream, about  long, in southern San Diego County, California. It is part of the Tijuana River drainage basin. 

The creek begins in the Laguna Mountains, in the Cleveland National Forest near Pine Valley. It flows south through the Cottonwood Valley into Lake Morena, which is formed by Morena Dam. Below the dam it turns west, flowing through a narrow gorge to Barrett Lake, created by Barrett Dam. From there it turns south, passing Barrett Junction, before joining with Tecate Creek to form the Rio Alamar, a tributary of the Tijuana River. Both Tecate Creek and the Alamar are located mostly in Mexico.

Both Morena and Barrett Reservoirs are part of the San Diego, California municipal water supply system. Water travels from Cottonwood Creek via the Dulzura Conduit to Lower Otay Reservoir. Cottonwood Creek provides only a small fraction of San Diego's water supply, which mainly depends on imported Colorado River water.

See also
List of rivers of California

References

Rivers of San Diego County, California